John Alexander (born May 22, 1954) is an American stock car racing driver. He has competed in both the NASCAR Busch Series and the Winston Cup Series. In the two races he entered, he did not finish.

NASCAR career
Alexander, born May 22, 1954, started racing in NASCAR in 1990, by competing in the Winston Cup Series' 1990 Budweiser at the Glen at Watkins Glen International. He started 39th and finished 38th after having an oil leak. He also competed in one Busch Series race in 1994, finishing 40th after being involved in a crash.

Motorsports career results

NASCAR
(key) (Bold – Pole position awarded by qualifying time. Italics – Pole position earned by points standings or practice time. * – Most laps led.)

Winston Cup Series

Busch Series

ARCA Permatex SuperCar Series
(key) (Bold – Pole position awarded by qualifying time. Italics – Pole position earned by points standings or practice time. * – Most laps led.)

References

External links

Living people
1954 births
Sportspeople from Elmira, New York
Racing drivers from New York (state)
NASCAR drivers
ARCA Menards Series drivers